Bakersfield Condors may refer to:

 Bakersfield Condors (AHL), current ice hockey team in the American Hockey League
 Bakersfield Condors (1998–2015), defunct ice hockey team that played in the West Coast Hockey League and the ECHL